Eystein Eggen (5 January 1944 in Oslo – 19 November 2010) was a Norwegian writer. Eggen was from a family with several other contemporary Norwegian writers.

Eggen made his debut with a book about the life and death of general Carl Gustav Fleischer, the Norwegian commander in chief at Narvik 1940. He also wrote a portrait of the writer Agnar Mykle, his father-in-law. Eggen wrote novels with topics from medieval Norway. In 1993 Eggen published The boy from Gimle—the autobiographical story of a Norwegian childhood in a Nazi milieu. As a consequence, two years later the Norwegian war children got an official excuse.
Eggen became a State Scholar in 2003. "He is a symbol of an entire generation", the spokesman for the Norwegian Labour Party said in parliament.

References

External links
Norwegian Government on Eggen (in English)
Stortinget: Møte fredag den 14. December kl. 10 2001 (in Norwegian)
An interview with Eggen

1944 births
2010 deaths
People from Tolga, Norway
Writers from Oslo
Norwegian World War II memoirists
20th-century Norwegian novelists
21st-century Norwegian novelists